Adrian Florin Piț (born 16 July 1983) is a Romanian footballer who plays as a midfielder for Liga III side Crișul Chișineu-Criș.

Club career
Piţ was born in Ştei.

He played with former teammate and countryman Cristian Ianu in UTA and Bellinzona, where he wore the number 10 shirt.

Piţ was signed by Roma from the Swiss Challenge League side AC Bellinzona on a free transfer, for a one-year contract which was later extended. Pit was subsequently loaned out to Serie B side Pisa for the 2008–09 season. But in February 2009, his loan was canceled.

He was successively confirmed with the AS Roma senior team for the 2009–10 season. He played his only match of the season so far as a substitute for Marco Cassetti at half-time of Coppa Italia Round 16 on 12 January 2010. He provided the assist for the winning goal in the 2–1 win over Siena on 31 January 2010.

Piţ was transferred to Liga I side Universitatea Cluj on 31 August 2010.

Piț left Khazar Lankaran on 26 July 2013, following their 0–8 home defeat to Maccabi Haifa in the 2nd Qualifying round of the 2013–14 UEFA Europa League. Piț re-signed with Khazar late in November, making his second debut for the club on 30 November in a 1–1 draw against AZAL.

Career statistics

References

External links
 

1983 births
Living people
People from Bihor County
Romanian footballers
Association football midfielders
Swiss Challenge League players
Serie A players
Serie B players
Liga I players
Liga II players
Azerbaijan Premier League players
FC UTA Arad players
AC Bellinzona players
A.S. Roma players
Pisa S.C. players
U.S. Triestina Calcio 1918 players
FC Universitatea Cluj players
Khazar Lankaran FK players
FC Viitorul Constanța players
Romanian expatriate footballers
Romanian expatriate sportspeople in Italy
Expatriate footballers in Italy
Romanian expatriate sportspeople in Switzerland
Expatriate footballers in Switzerland
Expatriate footballers in Azerbaijan
Romanian expatriate sportspeople in Azerbaijan